Will "Power" Rosinsky (born December 28, 1984) is a firefighter with the New York City Fire Department and a professional boxer hailing from Queens, New York.

Amateur career 
Rosinsky was a decorated amateur, winning the New York Golden Gloves four times, as well as the 2005 United States Amateur Champion at light heavyweight.

Professional career 
He successfully turned pro in 2008 with a first-round TKO over Valetine Fortanelly. On October 21, 2011, Rosinsky put his undefeated record on the line at MGM Theater, Foxwoods CT. He fought against Edwin "La Bomba" Rodriguez  which ended in a controversial 100-90 (x3) decision in favor of Rodriguez.  Will fought Kelly Pavlik on HBO Boxing After Dark on July 7, 2012 and lost by unanimous decision.

Professional boxing record

References

External links
 

1984 births
Living people
Boxers from New York (state)
Winners of the United States Championship for amateur boxers
American male boxers
Super-middleweight boxers